Philiodoron cinereum is a moth in the family Cossidae. It is found in Chile.

The length of the forewings is 14–17.5 mm. The forewing ground colour is grey with a black basal patch. The hindwings are greyish, occasionally showing a few faint darker transverse lines.

References

Natural History Museum Lepidoptera generic names catalog

Moths described in 1957
Hypoptinae
Endemic fauna of Chile